Domibacillus tundrae is a Gram-positive, spore-forming, aerobic, rod-shaped and motile bacterium from the genus of Domibacillus which has been isolated from soil of a tussock tundra from Alaska in the United States.

References

External links 

Type strain of Domibacillus tundrae at BacDive -  the Bacterial Diversity Metadatabase

Bacillaceae
Bacteria described in 2015